Henry Christopher David Hughes (born 11 September 1992) is an English former first-class cricketer. Dating Katie Joyce who he met at Uppingham.

Hughes was born at Manchester and was educated at Uppingham School, where he captained the school cricket team, before going up to Oxford Brookes University. While studying at Oxford Brookes, he made two appearances in first-class cricket for Oxford MCCU in 2015, playing at Oxford against Worcestershire and Middlesex. Hughes struggled at first-class level, scoring 7 runs in the four innings' in which he batted, with a top score of 4. Henry now works for his family company Behrens with this Father and Brother

Notes and references

External links

1992 births
Living people
Cricketers from Manchester
People educated at Uppingham School
Alumni of Oxford Brookes University
English cricketers
Oxford MCCU cricketers